Susana Myrta Ruiz Cerutti (born November 18,1940) is an Argentinian lawyer, diplomat, and politician, who occupied the position of Minister of Foreign Affairs and Worship (canciller) during the presidency of Raúl Alfonsín, from May 26 to July 8, 1989. This made her the first woman in Argentina's history to reach the post of foreign minister. She previously served as deputy foreign minister from 1987 to 1989, when she became foreign minister and later held other positions in that Ministry. During her diplomatic career, she was also Argentinian ambassador to Switzerland, Liechtenstein and Canada.

Education and early career
Having graduated in law from the University of Buenos Aires (UBA), Ruiz Cerutti practiced her profession until her entry to the Instituto del Servicio Exterior de la Nación, from which she graduated in 1968 with a gold medal and Honors diploma.

Diplomatic career
Between 1972 to 1985, Ruiz Cerutti led or took part in several diplomatic missions that resolved the Beagle Channel dispute through papal mediation. She was Argentina's permanent representative at the United Nations and the Organization of American States (OAS), and represented Argentina in other organizations. She also headed the Argentinian delegation in negotiations with Chile over boundary issues stemming from the Laguna del Desierto incident.

After serving as legal advisor to Argentina's Foreign Ministry, in 1987 she was appointed as Secretary of State (vicanciller – "vicechancellor", Deputy Foreign Minister). In May 1989, she was appointed by President Raúl Alfonsín as Foreign Minister (canciller – "chancellor"), in place of Dante Caputo. She held that position for 6 weeks, until the inauguration of President of Carlos Menem, who appointed Domingo Cavallo as her successor on July 9.

Ruiz Cerutti then resumed the post of Secretary of State until 1991, when she was appointed as Argentine Ambassador to Switzerland: as her credentials were accepted in Liechtenstein. Later she was appointed Ambassador to Canada from 1998 to 1999. Between 1999 and 2000, she was Special Representative for Islas Malvinas (Falkland Islands) and Southern Atlantic Islands affairs, with the rank of ambassador. In November 2000, she was appointed Secretary for Foreign Policy, replacing Enrique Candioti, during the presidency of Fernando de la Rúa.

She was re-appointed Legal Adviser to the Foreign Ministry in 2001, a position she holds today. In that position, she represented Argentina in the Uruguay River pulp mill dispute when the issue was before the International Court of Justice in The Hague.

She was the candidate favored by the United Nations Security Council in November 2014 to take a place as judge at the International Court of Justice, but the General Assembly's choice of Patrick Lipton Robinson prevailed in the final vote.

Awards and recognition
For her work resolving the "Laguna del Desierto" boundary dispute with Chile, Ruiz Cerutti was awarded the Pro Ecclesia et Pontifice and the Order of St. Gregory the Great from Pope John Paul II.

She has twice won the Konex Award, in 1998 and 2008, in the "Diplomacy" category.

In April 2012, she was appointed as Honorary Member of the Argentine National Academy of Geography, lecturing on "Geography in disputes between states", bringing to bear her expertise in international law.

See also
 List of Ministers of Foreign Affairs and Worship

References 

Argentine people of Italian descent
Dames of St. Gregory the Great
Argentine women ambassadors
Ambassadors of Argentina to Canada
Ambassadors of Argentina to Switzerland
Female foreign ministers
Foreign ministers of Argentina
1940 births
Women government ministers of Argentina
Living people
Argentine women lawyers
20th-century Argentine lawyers